Picoliva is a genus of sea snails, marine gastropod mollusks in the subfamily Plicolivinae of the family Volutidae.

Species
Species within the genus Picoliva include:
 Picoliva ryalli Bouchet, 1989
 Picoliva zelindae (Petuch, 1979)

References

External links
 Petuch, E. J. (1979). New gastropods from the Abrolhos Archipelago and reef complex, Brazil. Proceedings of the Biological Society of Washington 92(3):510-526. 4: figs
  Bouchet P. (1990). Systematics of Plicoliva, with description of a new subfamily (Gastropoda: Volutoidea). Archiv für Molluskenkunde. 120(1-3): 1-10. 

Volutidae